Into the Stars is a space simulator video game developed by Fugitive Games, a development team made up of former EA DICE and Spark Unlimited developers, and published by Iceberg Interactive. Following a successful Kickstarter crowdfunding campaign, the game was greenlit and went into the Steam Early Access program.

The goal of the Into the Stars is to reach the planet of Titus Nova, with one large "capital" spaceship and a limited amount of supplies. In order to achieve this the player must visit other planets to gather resources, negotiate with alien species, and attempt to escape the pursuit of an enemy threat known as the Skorn. 

Fugitive Games cited The Oregon Trail and FTL: Faster Than Light among their inspirations for the game.

Reception 
On Metacritic, Into the Stars received "mixed or average reviews".  Don Saas of GameSpot rated it 6/10 stars.  Saas praised the game's graphics, resource management, and the detailed character backgrounds, but he said that the unchanging map limits replayability.  He also found the game's difficulty inconsistent and too dependent on punishing random events.

References

External links
Into the Stars at Fugitive Games

Crowdfunded video games
Kickstarter-funded video games
Single-player video games
Space flight simulator games
Unreal Engine games
2016 video games
Video games scored by Jack Wall
Video games developed in the United States
Windows games
Windows-only games